HKPL may refer to:

Public libraries
 Hong Kong Public Libraries, a system of 70 static and 12 mobile public libraries in Hong Kong

Sports
 Hong Kong Premier League, a professional league based in Hong Kong for men's association football clubs